Mr. Fantastical, a.k.a. Harvey B. Fantastical, is the alter-ego of Jason Corman, former guitar player for Arizona rock band Jesus Chrysler Supercar, butcher, and solo-artist.

History

Jesus Chrysler Supercar
Jason Corman's (i.e., Mr. Fantastical's) first major foray into recording and releasing music came after joining Arizona-based band Jesus Chrysler Supercar.  In 1994, after recently moving to Phoenix from Nebraska, Corman auditioned for a spot on JCS and ultimately joined the group that also included vocalist Mitch Steele, guitarist Jaime Hickerson, bassist Erick Smith, and drummer Matt Collins.  Described then as a "David Koresh/Weird Al Yankovic look-alike", Corman's band would open for big-named groups such as Radiohead, Korn, the Goo Goo Dolls, and the Deftones.  "[F]amous for performing in NASCAR jumpsuits and playing rock heavy on the testosterone," JCS ultimately disbanded at the end of 1999 after what vocalist Mitch Steele described as "having plenty of opportunities and running into too many stumbling blocks."

Mr. Fantastical
A few years following the demise of Jesus Chrysler Supercar, Corman started Mr. Fantastical where his production over the years has ranged from his largely instrumental debut, to his second effort, a "funny children's album "Ham Hocks and Guitar Strings" on the Sunset Alliance label that just stopped short of having a Parental Advisory sticker slapped on it."

By his third full-length, "Born to Boogie, Born to Die," one critic described his sound as "deftly combined rig rock (the first time anyone has said 'Put the hammer down' on a recording since CW McCall), a bit of glam rock (the tip of the Pilgrim hat to "Born to Boogie"-era T. Rex), some ZZ Top and James Gang, some Devo weirdness and a wicked sendup of rebel flag rock called "I Ain't Southern But I Play Southern Rock On The Radio."  Weblog "Here Comes the Flood" actually named the record the seventh-best release of 2015 after declaring that the "record has its fair share of stomping good time music, but spin one of the smart instrumentals and be prepared to pick up your jaw from the floor."

Personal life
In 1995, Mr. Fantastical began his work as a butcher at his father-in-law's shop, The Pork Shop.  In addition to being known around the Phoenix metro-area as a place for getting great pork products, it has also gained some notoriety due to Corman's handlebar mustache. According to Corman, he and his alter-ego, Mr. Fantastical, began wearing his trademark mustache in 1997.  He relates that he had been growing the mustache to "stand out" in his band, Jesus Chrysler Supercar, and it had gotten rather long until 1997, when his wife complained about it.  On the way to playing a gig, he made a promise to his wife that if his hometown team, the Nebraska Cornhuskers won the college football national championship, he would shave it off.  However, that year, Nebraska finished first in only one of the polls, while the University of Michigan Wolverines finished first in the other.  So, after his gig, he shaved off only the middle of his mustache to celebrate his team's "half-win" and has let the sides grow since.

Discography

Jesus Chrysler Supercar Albums

Mr. Fantastical Albums

Compilations

References

External links
 Mr. Fantastical Official Website
 Sunset Alliance Records

Musicians from Mesa, Arizona
Indie rock musical groups from Arizona